Arinaitwe Rurihona, professionally known as Haka Mukiga is a Ugandan world and folk singer-songwriter, multi-instrumentalist, poet and dancer. He sings in a number of local languages including Rukiga, Acholi, Rukonjo and Rufumbira.

Education

Mukiga attended Vincent Alex Primary School in Mukono, Naalya SS, and Kisubi High School for his secondary school before enrolling at Makerere University in 2012 for a Bachelor of Arts degree, majoring in Tourism.

Rukiga  is his mother tongue, however Mukiga he composes music in various traditional instrumentations and languages, such as Acholi, Rukonjo and Rufumbira.

Music career
He is a multi-instrumentalist who plays instruments like enanga,Omukuri, Enzamba, Guitar and various others guitar . He started his professional music carrier in 2015 playing at festivals, scoring films,  and many other events like,  Pearl Rhythm stage coach and festival. He also performed at the Milege World Music Festival both 2014 and 2015, Nyege Nyege festival, Yella Cultural festival, Ongala festival in Tanzania and the Laba Festival.

On 13th April 2019, Mukiga played at the official Ugandan launch for the janzi, held by Ssewa Ssewa at Katonga Hall in Kampala.

Songs

Awards and nominations

See also

References

21st-century Ugandan male singers
Living people
Makerere University alumni
Ugandan world music musicians
Year of birth missing (living people)